Kim Ji-min (born November 30, 1984) is a South Korean comedian, television host, and actress. She debuted as a comedian on the sketch-comedy show Gag Concert in 2006. She is best known for her skits "Dignity of a Beggar," "Uncomfortable Truth," and "BBOOM Entertainment," as well as variety shows Human Condition and Crisis Escape No. 1. Since 2019, Kim departed from Gag Concert to appear on Comedy Big League.

Career

Kim Ji-min was born and raised in Donghae, Gangwon-do, South Korea. She has two older sisters and a younger brother. She graduated from Suwon Women's College with a degree in Cosmetology.

Kim Ji-min first made television appearance through an amateur comedy show Gag Hunt in 2006. She officially debuted on Gag Concert as a KBS 21st class comedian in 2006. She received the Best Newcomer (Female) award in the same year for her work in the skit "Lovers." After a period of hiatus, she returned to Gag Concert in 2012 with skits "Uncomfortable Truth" and "Dignity of a Beggar" and was awarded the Excellence Award in Comedy at the KBS Entertainment Awards. In 2013, she received the Top Excellence Award in Comedy at KBS Entertainment Awards for her continued work in Gag Concert. The following year, she was awarded the Top Excellence Award in the Variety for her work in the shows Crisis Escape No. 1, Family's Dignity Full House, and Human Condition, becoming the third person to win consecutive Top Excellence Awards at the KBS Entertainment Awards.

Personal life 
On April 3, 2022, it was confirmed that Kim is in a relationship with comedian Kim Jun-ho.

Filmography

Films

Television series

Television shows

Web shows

Awards and nominations

Discography
 "YK Family's Carol Racing" (2006)
 "Brilliant Is..." (2013)

Radio
KBSCoolFM "Lee Sora's Music Square" - Regular Guest
SBS Power FM "Kim Changyeol's Old School" - Regular Guest
MBC FM4U "Heo Gyeonghwan's Starry Night"- Regular Guest

Catchphrases 
"I have experience." - Bboom Entertainment (Korean: 느낌아니까)
"I'll get fat." - Bboom Entertainment (Korean: 살쪄)
"What's this?" - Old Affair (Korean: 어? 이건 뭐에요?)
"I'll do that drama!" - Bboom Entertainment (Korean: 그 드라마, 제가 할게요)
"So I'll stand out." - Bboom Entertainment (Korean: 나만 튀어보이게)
"Wait a minute boss. Don't you know that I~?" - Bboom Entertainment (Korean: 잠깐만 사장님, 나 ~하는 거 몰라요?)
"Try to understand me at one go." - Reveal the Story (Korean: 말좀 한번에 알아 들어요 - 사건의 전말)
"You beggar." - Dignity of a Beggar (Korean: 이 그지가 - 거지의 품격)

References 

South Korean women comedians
People from Gangwon Province, South Korea
People from Donghae City
1984 births
Living people
Gag Concert
South Korean television actresses
South Korean comedians